Indian Creek Township is one of eleven townships in Monroe County, Indiana, United States. As of the 2010 census, its population was 1,634 and it contained 681 housing units.

History
The John F. and Malissa Koontz House was listed on the National Register of Historic Places in 2014.

Geography

Unincorporated towns
 Buenavista at 
 Kirksville at 
 Victor at 
(This list is based on USGS data and may include former settlements.)

Cemeteries
According to local historical records the township contains 25 cemeteries, some dating back to the late 1830s.

School districts
 Monroe County Community School Corporation

Political districts
 Indiana's 4th congressional district
 State House District 60
 State Senate District 44

References
 
 United States Census Bureau 2008 TIGER/Line Shapefiles
 IndianaMap

External links
 Indiana Township Association
 United Township Association of Indiana
 City-Data.com page for Indian Creek Township

Townships in Monroe County, Indiana
Bloomington metropolitan area, Indiana
Townships in Indiana